Gleadow's house gecko (Hemidactylus gleadowi) is a species of gecko. It is endemic to India and Pakistan.

References

Hemidactylus
Reptiles described in 1884
Taxa named by James A. Murray (zoologist)
Reptiles of India
Reptiles of Pakistan
Endemic fauna of Pakistan